Here We Go Round the Mulberry Bush is a 1968 British comedy film produced and directed by Clive Donner, based on the 1965 novel of the same name by Hunter Davies. The film stars Barry Evans, Judy Geeson and Angela Scoular. It was listed to compete at the 1968 Cannes Film Festival, but the festival was cancelled due to the events of May 1968 in France.

The film was released on DVD and Blu-ray officially for the first time by the British Film Institute (BFI) in September 2010 as part of its "Flipside" strand.

Plot
Jamie McGregor (Barry Evans) is a virginal sixth-former in a Swinging Sixties new town, delivering groceries for the local supermarket. However he is more interested in matters sexual and sets out to lose his virginity by attempting to seduce the local girls – Linda, Paula, Caroline, and his dream girl, Mary. He ultimately succeeds in bedding the sexually aggressive Audrey, only to learn too late that sex is not as important as he initially believed.

Cast
 Barry Evans as Jamie McGregor
 Judy Geeson as Mary Gloucester
 Angela Scoular as Caroline Beauchamp
 Sheila White as Paula
 Adrienne Posta as Linda
 Vanessa Howard as Audrey
 Maxine Audley as Mrs. Beauchamp
 Denholm Elliott as Mr. Beauchamp
 Moyra Fraser as Mrs. McGregor
 Michael Bates as Mr. McGregor
 Diane Keen as Claire
 Christopher Timothy as Spike
 Nicky Henson as Craig Foster
 Allan Warren as Joe McGregor
 Roy Holder as Arthur
 George Layton as Gordon
 Christopher Mitchell as Tony
 Angela Pleasence as Scruffy Girl
 Marianne Stone as Mrs. Kelly
 Anthony Finch as Boy at Bowes Lyon House

Production

Music
The music was released by United Artists Records on a soundtrack album in 1968. It has been re-issued on CD by Rykodisc.  The Spencer Davis Group provided most of the music and made a cameo appearance in the film at a church fete. The title track "Here We Go Round the Mulberry Bush" was written and performed by Traffic.  Traffic also have two other songs on the soundtrack album "Am I What I Was or Was I What I Am" and a version of "Utterly Simple" that is different from the recording used on the album Mr Fantasy.  Andy Ellison of the group John's Children also appears on the soundtrack album with the song "It's Been a Long Time".

Filming locations
The location for the film was Stevenage New Town, Hertfordshire. Buildings featured include Stevenage Clock Tower in the town centre, which was the first purpose-built traffic-free shopping zone in Britain.

The sailing scenes at the "Botel" were filmed on Grafham Water, Huntingdonshire.

Release

A screening of the film at Cannes was booked, but it was never shown there due to the May 1968 events in France. Horror journalist Preston Fassel, in his biography of Vanessa Howard, reported this was the first incident in a string of unfortunate coincidences for the actress, whose career was continually derailed by circumstances beyond her control.

Box office
The film was the 14th-most popular movie at the Australian box office in 1969. It was the 10th-most popular film in general release at the British box office in 1968. According to Kinematograph Weekly, there were four British films in the top ten general releases of 1968: Up the Junction, Poor Cow, Here We Go Round the Mulberry Bush and Carry on Doctor.

References

External links
 
 
 

1960s coming-of-age comedy films
1960s sex comedy films
1967 films
British coming-of-age comedy films
British sex comedy films
British teen comedy films
1960s English-language films
Films about virginity
Films based on British novels
Films directed by Clive Donner
Films shot in Bedfordshire
Films shot in Hertfordshire
Stevenage
1960s British films